Jiexi County is a county of eastern Guangdong province, China. It is under the administration of Jieyang City.

Immigrants from Jiexi form a large overseas Chinese population who speak the Hepo dialect of Hakka (70%), mainly in Sarawak, Johor and Negeri Sembilan (Malaysia), and Bangka Belitung, Sumatra (Indonesia). Other people from Jiexi speak the Teochew dialect (30%). In the late 18th and early 19th century, settlers from Jiexi county formed the Lintian kongsi republic, an autonomous polity named after a temple in Jiexi dedicated to the Lords of the Three Mountains in Jieyang (揭阳霖田祖庙).

Jiexi is home to the Huangmanzhai waterfalls. There are ambitions to make Jiexi County a more attractive tourist destination following investment in 2010.

The Lords of the Three Mountains (also Kings of the Three Mountains) are a triad Taoist deities worshiped in Southern China  (mainly Teochew people) and the part of Hakka people in Taiwan. The Three Mountains refer to 3 mountains in Jiexi County:
Jin Mountain - protected by the Great Lord
Ming Mountain - protected by the Second Lord
Du Mountain - protected by the Third Lord

Geography

Climate

References

 
County-level divisions of Guangdong
Jieyang